Marc Alexander Benninga (born February 15, 1961 in Leiden) is a former Dutch field hockey player, who earned a total number of 53 caps, scoring no goals for the Netherlands national field hockey team in the 1980s and early 1990s.

An older brother of former Dutch field hockey player Carina Benninga, the defender was a member of the bronze medal-winning Dutch team at the 1988 Summer Olympics in Seoul.

References
  Dutch Olympic Committee
  Profile

External links
 

1961 births
Living people
Dutch male field hockey players
Olympic field hockey players of the Netherlands
Field hockey players at the 1988 Summer Olympics
Olympic bronze medalists for the Netherlands
Sportspeople from Leiden
Jewish sportspeople
Olympic medalists in field hockey
Medalists at the 1988 Summer Olympics
HC Bloemendaal players
1990 Men's Hockey World Cup players
20th-century Dutch people
21st-century Dutch people